The Cornell–Columbia football rivalry is the American college football rivalry between the Cornell Big Red and Columbia Lions, the two Ivy League teams in New York State. In 2010, the game was named the Empire State Bowl, and the teams began competing for the Empire Cup. Since 2018, it has been the final game on each team's schedule.

The Empire State Bowl served to replace the (Liberty Cup) that was played between Fordham University and Columbia University that ended in 2015 when Columbia ended the series after losing 6 years straight.  This lessor local rivalry was started in 1890 and parallels the Cornell-Colgate local rivalry in upstate NY. While Cornell and Columbia are both in the Ivy League, Colgate and Fordham are in The Patriot League so all four schools will periodically schedule games against one another.

Game results

See also 
 List of NCAA college football rivalry games
 List of most-played college football series in NCAA Division I

References

College football rivalries in the United States
Columbia Lions football
Cornell Big Red football
1889 establishments in New York (state)